Talia Ishai (born: 1994) is an Israeli musician, guitar player and singer. She is the bass player for the Israeli rock group "Haze'evot" and since joining has launched her own solo music career.

Biography 
Talia Ishai was born in Jerusalem. She's a music graduate of "The Yellow Submarine" school in Jerusalem.

Musical career 

In 2016, Ishai moved to Tel-Aviv where she played along with various bands among which are Noa Shemer's ensemble along with Yaron Amitai and Boaz Cohen. In addition, she played with Yifat Netz (of "The Witches") in the band "Hithaphu HaYotzrot" and at the "Holy Dead" event alongside Riki Gal, Dana Berger and more.

In 2017, Ishai joined the band "Haze'evot", with which she embarked on a European tour in 2018.

Ishai was once considered a "Tom Boy" and not once advocated her being a woman in a seemingly "male" profession.

In November 2018, she said in an interview to "Haaretz", in regards to her band "Haze'evot" that "The fact that we're four women is no gimmick and not a "thing", and I wish we would arrive at the day when nobody would consider it as such". Later that year she declared that she had never let her being a woman stop her.

In 2018, Ishai officially launched her solo career with music producer Toka Aylon whom she met 3 years earlier. She harmonized her first single "Pashut" (simple) in 2008, when she was 14, when her father, Ofer Ishai handed her a piece of paper with lyrics he had written.

In September 2020, Ishai released her debut solo album "Yom Reviei" (Wednesday).

Discography 

Singles

 Pashut (Simple) (2018)
 HaNasich HaKatan (The Little Prince) (2020)
 Pnai (Free Time) (2020)

Albums

Yom Reviei (Wednesday) (2020)

References

External links 

1994 births
Living people
21st-century Israeli women singers
People from Jerusalem
Israeli rock guitarists
Israeli bass guitarists
Women bass guitarists
21st-century bass guitarists